Lampasse(s) are trouser stripes adorning the dress uniforms of many armed forces, police, fire and other public uniformed services. In German speaking countries as general staff–qualified officers, their uniform featured these distinctive double-wide lampasses.

Germany 
The lampasses of the General Staff–qualified officers up to colonel were in carmine. However general uniforms featured lampasses in corps colour, e.g. Air Force in Skyblue.

For general officers of the German Bundeswehr the tradition to use lampasses was given up in 1956. However, general officers of the National People's Army, Volkspolizei and Stasi, as well as flag officers of the Volksmarine wore double-wide lampasses on uniform trousers in the appropriate corps colour until 1990.

See also 

In Germany today the general officers of the Bundespolizei wear double-wide Lampasses in deep green.

Historical examples

Lampasses today 
Lampasses are worn even today in a large number of national armed forces on dress uniform, full dress uniform, or duty uniform of general officers. The gold-coloured lampasses of the US-Cavalry is also well known.

See also 
 Waffenfarbe
 Blood stripe

Sources / references 

Staff (military)
Military insignia